The Old St James's Church is a former church in the village of Upton, Somerset, England, of which only the tower remains, overlooking Wimbleball Lake. The tower is recorded in the National Heritage List for England as a designated Grade II* listed building, and is in the care of the Churches Conservation Trust.  The church was declared redundant on 4 November 1971, and was vested in the Trust on 24 May 1973.

The only parts of the 14th-century church which remain are from the lowest courses of the nave and chancel, and the tower, which has three stages and was unbuttressed, however a buttress was added to the south east corner in the 19th century. The tower was made safe in 1973.

The current parish church of St James was built in 1870 to replace this church, as it was considered too far from the village.

The bells from the church have been reused elsewhere including one at the St John the Baptist in Pitney and one in Green Point, New South Wales, Australia.

See also
 List of churches preserved by the Churches Conservation Trust in South West England

References

Church of England church buildings in West Somerset
14th-century church buildings in England
Grade II* listed churches in Somerset
Grade II* listed buildings in West Somerset
Churches preserved by the Churches Conservation Trust
Church ruins in England
Former churches in Somerset
Grade II* listed ruins